Dinwiddie (also Dinwiddy) is a surname. Notable people with the name include:

Dinwiddie
 Bill Dinwiddie (born 1943), American basketball player
 Gene Dinwiddie (1936–2002), American blues saxophonist
 James Dinwiddie (surgeon), Confederate military surgeon
 James Dinwiddie (astronomer) (1746 - 1815), Scottish natural philosopher
 Marcus Dinwiddie (1906–1951), American sport shooter 
 Robert Dinwiddie (1693–1770), British lieutenant governor of colonial Virginia
 Robert Dinwiddie (golfer) (born 1982), English golfer
 Ryan Dinwiddie (born 1980), American gridiron football quarterback
 Spencer Dinwiddie (born 1993), American professional basketball player
 Traci Dinwiddie (born 1973), American film and television actress
 William Dinwiddie (1867–1934), American journalist, war photographer, writer and colonial administrator in the Philippines

Dinwiddy
 Bruce Dinwiddy (1946–2021), governor of the Cayman Islands
 Hugh Dinwiddy (1912–2009), English cricketer

See also
 Dinwiddie (disambiguation)